The Bispham Memorial Medal Award was an award for operas written in English which was named for baritone David Bispham, who was a great proponent of performing opera in English in the United States. It was traditionally awarded to American composers, frequently for an opera on an American subject. It originated from the Opera in Our Language Foundation, Inc., founded by composer Eleanor Everest Freer, and Edith Rockefeller McCormick, in 1921. After David Bispham's death in October 1921, Eleanor Everest Freer also founded the David Bispham Memorial Fund, Inc., in March 1922. Eleanor Everest Freer was chairman, and Edith Rockefeller McCormick was treasurer, of both organizations. On April 7, 1924, the two organizations merged to become the American Opera Society of Chicago. The first medal was awarded by the American Opera Society of Chicago in 1924 to Ernest Trow Carter, for his opera The White Bird, which saw its first full performance at the Studebaker Theater, in Chicago, on March 6, 1924. (The Opera in Our Language Foundation, Inc. sponsored the performance.) The last Medal for an opera was awarded around 1953 to Vittorio Giannini for The Taming of the Shrew. The award was funded in part by David Bispham's will, and also in part by Eleanor Everest Freer, who, in addition, was one of its recipients (for The Legend of the Piper). Other recipients include (alphabetically by author):

References

David Ewen, Encyclopedia of the Opera: New Enlarged Edition.  New York; Hill and Wang, 1963.
List of winners, cited on Opera-L

American music awards
Awards established in 1921
1921 establishments in Illinois
1932 disestablishments in Illinois